Kitcher is a surname. Notable people with the surname include: 

Deidre Kitcher, Australian producer
Martin Kitcher (1962–2015), British singer-songwriter
Patricia Kitcher (born 1948), American philosopher
Philip Kitcher (born 1947), British philosopher
Tony Kitcher (born 1941), British diver